Eric Rhead (born February 18, 1984) is an American professional stock car racing driver. He competes part-time in the ARCA Menards Series West, driving the No. 66 Chevrolet SS for 66 Rhead Racing.

Racing career

ARCA Menards Series West
Rhead made his ARCA Menards Series West debut in 2022 in the General Tire 150 at Phoenix Raceway for 66 Rhead Racing. Rhead failed to start the race, but was still listed as finishing 39th.

ARCA Menards Series
Rhead ran the 2022 General Tire 150, due to it being a combination race with the ARCA Menards Series West, and failed to start.

Motorsports career results

ARCA Menards Series

ARCA Menards Series West

References

External links 

1984 births
Living people
ARCA Menards Series drivers
NASCAR drivers
Racing drivers from Utah